When the Alpine Roses Bloom is a 1955 West German drama film directed by Richard Häussler and Hans Deppe and starring Hertha Feiler, Claus Holm, and Marianne Hold. Along with As Long as the Roses Bloom, it was one of two follow-ups directed by Depp to his hit 1953 heimatfilm When the White Lilacs Bloom Again.

It was shot at the Spandau Studios in Berlin and on location in the Austrian state of Tyrol. The film's sets were designed by the art director Heinrich Weidemann.

Cast

References

Bibliography

External links 
 

1955 films
West German films
German drama films
1955 drama films
1950s German-language films
Films directed by Hans Deppe
Films directed by Richard Häussler
Constantin Film films
Films set in the Alps
Films shot at Spandau Studios
1950s German films